"I Can See Through You" is the second single from the Horrors third album, Skying, released 3 October 2011 only as a promotional two-track CD single in the UK, by XL Recordings.

External links 

 Stereogum article on the song's music video
 Consequence of Sound article on the song's music video
 Fact article on the song's music video
 Exclaim.ca's article on the song's music video
 Article about song being played during Labour speech

2011 singles
The Horrors songs
2011 songs
XL Recordings singles